Josip Zidarn (September 24, 1909 in Zagreb – April 25, 1982) is a Yugoslav canoeist who competed in the 1936 Summer Olympics. In 1936 he finished tenth in the K-1 10000 m event.

References

Josip Zidarn's profile at Sports Reference.com

1909 births
Sportspeople from Zagreb
People from the Kingdom of Croatia-Slavonia
Canoeists at the 1936 Summer Olympics
Olympic canoeists of Yugoslavia
1982 deaths
Yugoslav male canoeists
Croatian male canoeists